Richard J. Pierce is an American legal scholar known for his work in Administrative Law and Government Regulation with particular expertise in the energy industry.  He is the Lyle T. Alverson Professor of Law at George Washington University School of Law.  He has been called the "most frequently cited scholar in the United States in the field of administrative law and government regulation".  He has published over 150 books and articles and has been extensively cited by United States Courts including the United States Supreme Court.  He is a Senior Fellow of the Administrative Conference of the United States.

Education 
Pierce earned his J.D. from the University of Virginia School of Law.  Prior to Law School, he earned his B.S. in Economics from Lehigh University.

Professional career 
After graduating Law School, Pierce worked as an attorney at Sutherland, Asbill & Brennan.  In 1977 he began teaching at the University of Kansas School of Law (19771981).  He then taught at the University of Virginia School of Law (19801981), Tulane University School of Law (19811984), the University of Pittsburgh School of Law (19841986), Southern Methodist University School of Law (19861989), and Columbia Law School (19891995) before moving to George Washington University School of Law in 1995.

Pierce has testified as an expert on Administrative Law before Congress including on March 15, 2016 before the House Committee on the Judiciary and on July 7, 2016 before the House Committee on the Budget.

Administrative Law Treatise 
In 1994, Pierce became co-author of the 3rd edition of Kenneth Culp Davis' Administrative Law Treatise, the "canonical reference guide" that pioneered the field of Administrative Law.  When Davis died in 2003, Pierce took over sole authorship for the 4th edition.  In 2015 Kristin E. Hickman of the University of Minnesota Law School became Pierce's new co-author on the Treatise.

Selected works

Books

Articles

Court Briefs

References 

Living people
Pierce Jr., Richard J.
Pierce Jr., Richard J.
Pierce Jr., Richard J.
Year of birth missing (living people)
American legal scholars